Cricket Association of Nepal (CAN) is the official governing body of cricket in Nepal. It was suspended from 2016 to 13 October 2019 due to governmental interference. The ICC welcomed the elections of the board held in September 2019 and formally reinstated the board on a conditional basis on 14 October. Its headquarters is in Kathmandu, Nepal. Cricket Association of Nepal is Nepal's representative at the International Cricket Council (ICC) and remains an associate member, having been a member since 1988 AD (2045 BS). It is also a member of the Asian Cricket Council (ACC).

The board was dissolved by the government of Nepal in November 2014 on the grounds of incompetence and a three-member ad hoc committee was established with a new president designated by the government itself. In April 2016, CAN was suspended by the ICC, on the grounds of government interference in its operations. The suspension did not affect the ability of Nepal's national teams to participate in ICC tournaments. In October 2019, the ICC lifted its suspension on the Cricket Association of Nepal.

Domestic cricket

Domestic competitions 
The CAN organizes the following domestic cricket competitions:

Men's 
 Nepal T20 League
 Everest Premier League
 Manmohan Memorial National One-Day Cup
 Kathmandu Mayor's Cup
 Nepal Pro Club Championship
 Multi Day Champions Cup
 Prime Minister Cup One-Day Cricket Tournament
 Asian Challenger Trophy

Women's 

Prime Minister Cup Women's National Tournament
Lalitpur Mayor's Cup

National teams 
Nepal's position at the top of the ACC rankings rests on its consistent performance at all levels of competition. Wins in U-19 cricket World Cups against Pakistan, New Zealand, and South Africa have been based on disciplined, error-free cricket.

Sri Lanka's batsman Roy Dias, who took over as coach in 2001, was the architect of Nepal's triumphs and he molded a nation high on enthusiasm and short of experience into a competitive force. A good example of his ability to maximize the skills of his charges was seen in the performance of the U-15 team in the 2006 ACC Elite Cup.: only two of the Nepal squad had ever played any competitive cricket before reaching Malaysia to play the event, two weeks later they had won it.

A regime change at the Cricket Association of Nepal has led to the adoption of a more professional approach to development. Greater sponsorship and more focused domestic competitions have been the result. Work has already started on a national Academy, felt to be vital given the extremes of Nepal's weather for indoor practice, which will be partly funded by the ACC. Nepal plays most of its international matches at the Tribhuwan University International Cricket Ground in the outskirts of Kathmandu. Other grounds include Engineering College Ground in Pulchowk. A host of other grounds are used for domestic tournaments including Tudikhel, Army School Ground and Lab School Ground. Various cricket academies have surfaced since 2010, like Sangrila Cricket Academy, Dhangadi Cricket Academy, and Jhapa Cricket Academy. The National Cricket Academy started functioning in late 2011. CAN has partly funded two upcoming national cricket academies in Mulpani and Pokhara.

Former coach Pubudu Dassanayake added the batting strength which had long been the Achilles' heel for Nepalese cricket. Under Dassanayake, Nepal has won World Cricket League divisions 4 and 3 (twice). Nepal participated in the 2014 ICC World Twenty20 in Bangladesh in March 2014, where they produced some good 
performances, narrowly missing out on the next round on net run rate. As a result, they were awarded T20 International status by the ICC along with the Netherlands.

Organization

Presidents 
 Jay Kumar Nath Shah (1966 – September 2006 = 40 years) One of the longest serving cricket association president in the world. He was forced out for failure to hold an election and improve the game in country.
Binay Raj Pandey (September 2006 – December 2011) A long serving cricket administrator with business background. He was forced out by the Maoist government showing his failure to hold an election, a requirement of International Cricket Committee.
 Tanka Angbuhaang (December 2011 – June 2014) He was politically appointed by the Maoist government of Nepal. He has no cricketing or sports administration background. During his reign he appointed new coach, made bilateral ties with minor cricket teams in India.
 TB Shah (Interim) (June 2014 – November 2014)
Binay Raj Panday (Interim) (Since November 2014) He was appointed after the previous working committee formed under Tanka Angabuhang was dissolved by the Government.
 Chatur Bahadur Chand (September 2019 – present)

Between 2014 and 2016, Bhawana Ghimire was CEO of the Cricket Association of Nepal.

Affiliated domestic boards 

 Province 1 Cricket Association
 Ilam District Cricket Association
 Jhapa District Cricket Association
 Morang District Cricket Association
 Sunsari District Cricket Association
 Udaypur District Cricket Association

 Cricket Madhesh
 Bara District Cricket Association
 Dhanusha District Cricket Association
 Mahottari District Cricket Association
 Parsa District Cricket Association
 Rautahat District Cricket Association
 Saptari District Crcicket Association
 Sarlahi District Cricket Association
 Siraha District Cricket Association

 Cricket Bagmati
 Bhaktapur District Cricket Association
 Chitwan District Cricket Association
 Kathmandu District Cricket Association
 Lalitpur District Cricket Association
 Makwanpur District Cricket Association
 Nuwakot District Cricket Association

 Cricket Gandaki                 
 Gorkha  District Cricket Association 
 Kaski District Cricket Association
 Nawalpur District Cricket Association
 Syangja District Cricket Association
 Tanahun District Cricket Association

 Cricket Lumbini(also includes Karnali Province|Cricket Karnali)
 Banke District Cricket Association
 Bardiya District Cricket Association
 Dang District Cricket Association
 Kapilvastu District Cricket Association
 Palpa District Cricket Association
 Parasi District Cricket Association
 Rupandehi District Cricket Association
 Surkhet District Cricket Association

 Sudurpaschim Cricket
 Achham District Cricket Association
 Baitadi District Cricket Association
 Bajhang District Cricket Association
 Dadeldhura District Cricket Association
 Darchula District Cricket Association
 Doti District Cricket Association
 Kailali District Cricket Association
 Kanchanpur District Cricket Association

Controversies 
Despite unprecedented success on the field, including victories over Hong Kong and Afghanistan at the 2014 ICC World Twenty20, Nepal went through some turmoil off the field in 2014 with a boycott of the national one-day tournament by the national players with the captain Paras Khadka slamming the Cricket Association of Nepal for their treatment of national players.

The board then came under an investigation by the Commission for Investigation into Abuse of Authority. Later, CIAA filed a case against 18 CAN members including the then President Tanka Aangabuhang, after finding them guilty of misusing around Rs. 14.31 million, which was to be used for developing the game in the country instead. This resulted in several CAN members stepping down from their posts on moral grounds.

In May, members of CAN filed a no-confidence motion against president Tanka Angbuhang, after the organization of the Nepal Premier League was outsourced to a private sports management firm.

In March, the CAN had said Nepal coach Pubudu Dassanayake would get a year's extension to his contract. However, he was only given a three-month extension, which ran out later June. The change in terms, CAN secretary Ashok Nath Pyakuryal said, was due to the board being under investigation. The coach left the country on 4 June due to unresolved contractual issues.

But the Government of Nepal intervened and handed Dassanayake a year's extension. Dassanayake returned to Nepal on 29 August after being invited by the government and was reappointed coach of Nepal's senior and Under-19 cricket teams.

After all these controversies in the year 2014, the Nepal Government dissolved the Angbuhang led CAN committee on 6 November and formed an ad hoc committee under former president Binaya Raj Pandey on an interim basis.

As a result of the governmental involvement in its running, the ICC suspended CAN in April 2016, though allowed the national teams to continue playing in international competitions.

See also 

 Nepal national cricket team
 Nepal national women's cricket team
 Nepal national under-19 cricket team
 Cricket in Nepal
 National League
 Nepal Premier League
 Prime Minister One Day Cup
 Prime Minister Cup Women's National Tournament
 Everest Premier League
 List of cricket grounds in Nepal
  Asian Challenger Trophy

References

External links 
 
 

Nepal
Cricket in Nepal
Sports organizations established in 1946
Sports governing bodies in Nepal